Kanna Ravi is an Indian actor who has appeared in Tamil language films. After making his film debut in the Tamil film Veera (2018), he has been in films including Kaithi (2019) and Rathasaatchi (2022).

Career
Kanna Ravi began his acting career in 2012, training under the guidance of Balu Mahendra, and initially worked on a number of short films. Notably, he played the lead role in Dheeraj Vaidy's original pilot sort film Jil Jung Juk, as well as a pivotal role in the web series Livin. He made his film debut through Veera (2018), working alongside actor Kreshna. He was later seen in films including Lokesh Kanagaraj's Kaithi (2019) and Sri Ganesh's Kuruthi Aattam (2022), where he worked alongside Atharvaa.

He played his first role as the main protagonist in Rafiq Ismail's Rathasaatchi (2022), an action drama based on Jeyamohan's short story Kaithigal. The film opened to positive reviews, with critics widely praising Kanna's portrayal of the naxalite Appu. A reviewer from Cinema Express wrote "Kanna Ravi especially hits it out of the park in his first project as a lead", and that "be it rage, empathy, love, or surprise, his eyes speak a lot. Tight close-ups serve to replace pages and pages of dialogues. For instance, when a young Naxal comrade takes a bullet for him, he doesn't scream; instead, we see him freeze and the camera lingers on his face as we see guilt and helplessness wash him from within".

Filmography

Films

Television series

Voice actor

References

External links

Indian film actors
Tamil actors
Living people
Actors in Tamil cinema
Year of birth missing (living people)
21st-century Indian actors
Male actors in Tamil cinema